Toralf Engan (born 1 October 1936) is a retired Norwegian ski jumper. At the 1964 Winter Olympics he won the  large hill and placed second in the new normal hill event. His other victories include the Four Hills Tournament, which he had won the preceding season, as well as the 1962 FIS Nordic World Ski Championships in the individual normal hill (the first ever in that event). Engan won the ski jumping normal hill event at the 1962 Holmenkollen ski festival, the same year he won the Holmenkollen medal. Engan retired after the 1966 season. Later he worked as a national ski jumping coach in 1967–69, and settled in Trondheim with his family.

References

External links

 
 Holmenkollen medalists – click Holmenkollmedaljen for downloadable pdf file 
 Holmenkollen winners since 1892 – click Vinnere for downloadable pdf file 

1936 births
Living people
People from Melhus
Ski jumpers at the 1964 Winter Olympics
Holmenkollen medalists
Holmenkollen Ski Festival winners
Norwegian male ski jumpers
Olympic ski jumpers of Norway
Olympic gold medalists for Norway
Olympic silver medalists for Norway
Olympic medalists in ski jumping
FIS Nordic World Ski Championships medalists in ski jumping
Medalists at the 1964 Winter Olympics
Sportspeople from Trøndelag
20th-century Norwegian people